Silver Creek is a river in the municipality of Huron East, Huron County, Ontario, Canada and a right tributary of the Bayfield River.

Course
It flows southwest and takes in right and left tributary creeks before passing under Ontario Highway 8 on the east side of Seaforth.

Ecology
The Ausable Bayfield Conservation Authority has rated the Upper Bayfield Headwaters, which includes Silver Creek, a "D" for forest conditions and a "C" for surface water quality. A monitoring point for Benthic zone marine invertebrates is located on the upper Silver Creek. No at-risk species have been identified in the drainage basin. Reforestation has been identified as the priority strategy  for improving forest conductions and water quality.

See also
List of rivers of Ontario

References

Rivers of Huron County, Ontario